Kym Loren Worthy (born December 5, 1956) is an American lawyer and politician serving as the prosecutor of Wayne County, Michigan since 2004. A member of the Democratic Party, she is the first African-American woman to serve as a county prosecutor in Michigan. She became internationally recognized for prosecuting then-Detroit Mayor Kwame Kilpatrick at the beginning of March 2008.

Worthy received her undergraduate degree from the University of Michigan and her J.D. degree from the university of Notre Dame Law School. She attended high school in Alexandria, Virginia and is a 1974 graduate of T.C. Williams High School.

Worthy started as an assistant prosecutor in the Wayne County Prosecutor's in 1984. She served in this position for ten years, becoming the first African-American special assignment prosecutor under Prosecutor John O'Hair. Her most notable prosecution was the trial of Walter Budzyn and Larry Nevers in the beating death of Malice Green. Worthy had an over 90% conviction rate. In 1994, Worthy was elected to the Detroit Recorder's Court (now the Wayne County Circuit Court). From 1994 until January 2004, Worthy was a judge on the Wayne County Circuit Court.

In 2004, Worthy was appointed by the judges of the Wayne County Circuit Court bench to replace now Detroit Mayor Mike Duggan, who resigned to become the head of the Detroit Medical Center.

The Wayne County Prosecutor's Office is by far the busiest in Michigan. There are 83 counties in Michigan yet Worthy's office handles 52% of all felony cases in Michigan and 64% of all serious felony cases that go to jury trial. In 2013 Worthy sued Wayne County alleging that Wayne County Executive Robert A. Ficano had provided her with an insufficient budget to fulfill her duties as outlined in the Michigan State Constitution. In June 2014 Worthy backed Warren Evans in his successful race to oust then Wayne Robert A. Ficano in the Democratic Primary.

Detroit sexual assault kit backlog

In 2009 Worthy began working on resolving a massive backlog of unprocessed rape test kits in Detroit. Despite years of refusal to even allow assistant prosecutors to look for them for over a decade.;  On August 17, 2009, assistant prosecutor Robert Spada discovered a massive number of kits sitting in a warehouse that the Detroit Police Department had used as an overflow storage facility for evidence. The  11,431 sexual assault kits languished in the DPD property warehouse from 1984 to 2009 without being submitted for testing. In one case, a 2002 rape was linked to a man who was incarcerated for three murders he committed in the seven years after the rape.

From the inception of the project Worthy has been committed to ensuring that every kit is tested, every kit is investigated and that a victim-centered approach to the investigation of sexual assault is implemented. Because the City of Detroit was in bankruptcy and the then Wayne County Executive Robert Ficano would not provide funding for the project Worthy turned to the Detroit Crime Commission, Michigan Women's First Foundation and the African-American 490 Coalition to form a public- private partnership to raise funds to test the kits.; Donations also were given by citizens from all over the United States. The project received grants and funding from the National Institute for Justice, the State of Michigan and the New York District Attorneys Office. An important academic study of the project was authored by Michigan State University Professor Rebecca Campbell.;

In September 2016 Worthy hosted the first Detroit Sexual Assault Kit Summit that was attended by prosecutors, police, sexual assault victim service workers, academics, and journalists to share information learned from the Detroit Project. prosecutor-worthy-to-host-3-day-sexual-assault-kit-summit.

In 2018 Worthy was featured in the documentary I Am Evidence. The documentary won a number of awards including the Emmy in 2019 for the Best Documentary in the News and Documentary category.

The 10th Anniversary of the Detroit Rape Kit Project was marked by a commemorative ceremony celebrating the completion of the testing of all of the rape kits, state legislation that sets out time line for the submission of kits for testing and a statewide tracking system that allows victims to follow the progression of their kit for DNA testing.

In 2020 the mission of the Detroit Sexual Assault Kit Project continues with investigations and prosecutions of rapists. As of June 2020 there have been 219 convictions, and 2234 cases that are actively being investigated. The cases tested from this project have been linked to 40 states: Alabama, Alaska, Arizona, Arkansas, California, Colorado, Delaware, Florida, Georgia, Illinois, Indiana, Iowa, Kansas, Kentucky, Louisiana, Maine, Maryland, Michigan, Minnesota, Mississippi, Missouri, Nebraska, Nevada, New Jersey, New Mexico, New York, North Carolina, North Dakota, Ohio, Oklahoma, Oregon, Pennsylvania, South Carolina, Tennessee, Texas, Utah, Virginia, Washington, West Virginia, and Wisconsin. The Detroit Rape Kit Project has been a leader in this field establishing best practices across the county.

Conviction integrity unit

After wanting to have a Conviction Integrity Unit (CIU) for many years Worthy received the funding with the support of Wayne County Executive Warren C. Evans, from the Wayne County Commission in 2017. The Wayne County Prosecutor's Office CIU became operational in January 2018 and has received over 700 requests for investigation. It is headed by Director Valerie Newman.

"We are committed to taking these new claims of innocence seriously and we need any and all additional resources we can muster,” Worthy said.

The Conviction Integrity Unit (the "CIU") investigates claims of innocence, to determine whether there is clear and convincing new evidence that the convicted defendant was not the person who committed the conviction offense. As stated in the American Bar Association standards, Rule 3.8(h), "When a prosecutor knows of clear and convincing evidence establishing that a defendant in the prosecutor's jurisdiction was convicted of an offense that the defendant did not commit, the prosecutor shall seek to remedy the conviction." CIU makes recommendations to the Wayne County Prosecutor about the appropriate remedy (if any) that should result from its findings. The Wayne County Prosecutor makes all final decisions about whether a remedy should be provided to a person seeking review by the CIU.
The CIU is not a court and its work is not governed by court rules of procedure. CIU investigates claims of actual innocence based on new evidence; it does not function as a "13th juror" to review factual questions that already have been decided by a jury. Its mission is to determine whether new evidence shows that an innocent person has been wrongfully convicted of a crime, and to recommend steps to rectify such situations. As of June 2020, there  have been 19 prisoners who have filed claims and been released from prison.

Prosecutor Worthy Dismisses Charges Against 10-Year-Old

On  April 29, 2019, it was alleged that a 10-year-old child, struck another child in the face with a ball during a game of Tips at Ruth Eriksson Elementary, in Canton, Michigan. The child who was struck in the face sustained a black eye, bruised nose and later received treatment in the ER for a concussion. According to the injured child's mother, the boy had previous head injuries. The 10-year-old was charged by a Juvenile Unit assistant prosecutor with a juvenile misdemeanor, Aggravated Assault. The decision was not reviewed or approved by any supervisor which is required under office protocol. On July 31, 2019, the case was permanently dismissed by the Wayne County Prosecutor's Office.

Prosecutor Worthy said, “The charge in this case was a mistake in judgment by this office, even though it was rectified by permanently dismissing the case on July 31, 2019, prior to the first scheduled court proceeding. To be clear, my office will not be refiling this petition, nor was it ever the intent of our office to do so. I have taken this extremely seriously, and concrete steps have already been made. I am currently reviewing the policies and procedures of our Juvenile Division and re-enforcing internal measures to prevent a similar matter from occurring in the future.”

Juvenile mediation program

WCPO Partners with the Wayne County Dispute Resolution Center on New Program

"I am pleased today to announce a partnership between the Wayne County Prosecutor's Office and the Wayne County Dispute Resolution Center. Together we will offer, through mediation, an alternative to charging adolescents and teens with certain offenses. Instead, they will meet with stakeholders, including the crime victims, to craft a solution short of formal charges. Wrap around services, counseling, and other options may be included in the solution. This program gives crime victims a voice and opportunity to impact the lives of the youth who victimized them. Collaboratively, it is our hope that if they successfully complete the recommended course of action, fewer juveniles will find themselves charged with a delinquency offense that may result in a delinquency record", said Prosecutor Worthy.

Why Talk It Out? Every year the Juvenile Division of the Wayne County Prosecutor's Office (WCPO) handles thousands of juvenile delinquency cases. While many of these matters are set on the formal court docket of the Third Circuit Family Division, there is a new alternate path available on appropriate cases. Prosecutor Worthy, in partnership with the Wayne County Dispute Resolution Center (WCDRC), offers select youth the option to participate in a unique juvenile mediation program called Talk It Out.* Although it is imperative that each juvenile who commits a delinquent act is held responsible for his or her conduct, Prosecutor Worthy recognizes the negative impact that juvenile adjudications may have on the future of young people. Those consequences may include: suspension or expulsion from school; the loss of college scholarships or the denial of college admission; and the required disclosure of a delinquency record on a job or military application. The WCPO has created a program that balances the need for delinquent youth to accept responsibility for their actions and the interests of delinquency victims seeking justice. With the assistance of an experienced WCDRC facilitator, Talk It Out will bring selected juvenile offenders and their victims together with a focus on repairing the harm resulting from the minor's behavior. The goal of Talk It Out is to provide an alternative to formal prosecution that gives delinquent youth an opportunity to take responsibility and make amends, while also giving the victims a forum to be heard and healed. Which juveniles are eligible to participate in Talk It Out? Upon successful referral by the WCPO, participants in Talk It Out are expected to take responsibility for their delinquent behavior and take reasonable steps to repair and/or alleviate harm done to the victims of their conduct. These juveniles must also be willing to hear from victims, including how their actions have harmed or impacted the victim. WCPO Assistant Prosecuting Attorneys (APAs) will evaluate new delinquency complaints to determine which cases are appropriate to recommend for Talk It Out. Except for a prior status or ordinance offense, only matters that constitute a juvenile's first delinquency violation will be considered. Examples of delinquency offenses to be considered for Talk It Out referral include minor property damage, theft, or simple assault. Eligible cases must have no more than one victim, and a parent/guardian of the juvenile must be willing to transport their child to all meetings scheduled as a part of the mediation process. Each victim will be contacted by an APA and must agree to the referral and mediation process before a case is accepted into the Talk It Out program.

Richard Wershe, Jr.  [edit]
The 2017 documentary White Boy detailed evidence that high-ranking Detroit officials engaged in a decades-long conspiracy to unjustly imprison Richard Wershe Jr., a former FBI informant arrested for possession of 8 kg of cocaine in 1987, when Wershe was only 17 years old. Despite being a non-violent offender and a juvenile at the time of his sentencing, Wershe was held in a Michigan prison for 29 years. In September 2015, Wayne County Circuit Judge Dana Hathaway ruled that Wershe's life sentence was unconstitutional and that he should be re-sentenced.  Prosecutor Worthy objected to Hathaway's ruling, and Wershe lost his appeal for re-sentencing.[27]   Worthy claimed she objected because Wershe was charged and convicted of operating a car theft ring in Florida when he was in prison there. One subject interviewed suggested that she was motivated by her "personal and professional" ties to former Detroit City Council President Gil Hill, subject of an FBI investigation for which Wershe was an informant. On August 26, 2016, Worthy changed her position after public pressure and news reporting about this conflict of interest. She did not help to release Wershe but merely did not object to his parole from the Michigan Department of Corrections.

Michigan Women's Hall of Fame

In 2018 after a distinguished career with many awards Worthy was inducted for her years of tireless work as the Wayne county Prosecutor and specifically for her outstanding work on resolving the Detroit Sexual Assault Kit Backlog. The other inductees were Dr. Mona Hanna-Attisha, Agatha Biddle and Clara Stanton Jones.

References

External links 
 Detroit News, August 16th, 2004

1957 births
African-American women lawyers
African-American lawyers
American prosecutors
Living people
Michigan lawyers
University of Michigan alumni
Place of birth missing (living people)
Notre Dame Law School alumni
T. C. Williams High School alumni
21st-century African-American people
21st-century African-American women
20th-century African-American people
20th-century African-American women